Måsøy is a municipality in Troms og Finnmark county, Norway. The administrative centre of the municipality is the village of Havøysund. Other villages include Bakfjord, Gunnarnes, Ingøy, Måsøy, Slåtten, and Snefjord. The municipality is located on the mainland as well as several islands.

The  municipality is the 97th largest by area out of the 356 municipalities in Norway. Masøy is the 322nd most populous municipality in Norway with a population of 1,162.

The municipality includes the Fruholmen Lighthouse, the northernmost lighthouse in Norway as well as the Havøysund Bridge, the northernmost bridge in the world.

The Hurtigruten coastal express boat stops at the village of Havøysund daily. There is also a road connection to Havøysund, albeit often blocked by snow in the winter at the pass between Snefjord and Bakfjord. Norwegian County Road 889 connects the mainland to Havøysund. Bus services between Havøysund and Olderfjord (bus hub), operates twice a day. The nearest airport is Lakselv Banak Airport.

General information

The town of Hammerfest and the vast surrounding rural district of Hammerfest was established as the municipality of Hammerfest by og landdistrikt on 1 January 1838 (see formannskapsdistrikt law). Soon after (the same year), the northern district (population: 498) was separated to become the new municipality of Maasøe, named after the village on the island of Måsøya where the local church is located. The spelling was later changed to Måsøy.

On 1 January 1963, a small area of southern Måsøy, north of Kokelv, (population: 34) was transferred to neighboring Kvalsund Municipality. On 1 January 1984, the western part of the island of Magerøya (population: 240) was transferred from Måsøy to the neighboring Nordkapp Municipality.

On 1 January 2020, the municipality became part of the newly formed Troms og Finnmark county. Previously, it had been part of the old Finnmark county.

Name
The first element is måse which means "seagull" and the last element is øy which means "island". Previously, the village of Måsøy was the administrative centre since the main Måsøy Church was located there, hence it became the name of the municipality. Prior to 1918, the name was written Maasøe or Maasø.

Coat of arms
The coat of arms was granted on 7 September 1984. The official blazon is "Gules, a gaff bendwise Or". This means the arms have a red field (background) and the charge is a fishing gaff. The gaff has a tincture of Or which means it is commonly colored yellow, but if it is made out of metal, then gold is used. A gaff is a stick with a metal hook or a barbed spear (historically it was made of bone). It is used for pulling large fish onto a boat. These fishing gaffs have been used for many centuries in the municipality. The tool was chosen as a symbol for the importance of fishing to the municipality. The arms were designed by Arvid Sveen.

Churches
The Church of Norway has one parish within the municipality of Måsøy. It is part of the Hammerfest prosti (deanery) in the Diocese of Nord-Hålogaland.

Government
All municipalities in Norway, including Måsøy, are responsible for primary education (through 10th grade), outpatient health services, senior citizen services, unemployment and other social services, zoning, economic development, and municipal roads. The municipality is governed by a municipal council of elected representatives, which in turn elect a mayor.  The municipality falls under the Hammerfest District Court and the Hålogaland Court of Appeal.

Municipal council
The municipal council  of Måsøy is made up of 15 representatives that are elected to four year terms. The party breakdown of the council is as follows:

Mayors
The mayors of Måsøy (incomplete list):
2019–present: Bernth Sjursen (Ap)
2017-2019: Reidun Helene Mortensen (Sp)
2014-2017: Gudleif Kristiansen (Sp)
2011-2014: Anne Karin Olli  (H)
2009-2011: John Aase (Ap)
1995-2009: Ingalill Olsen (Ap)

Geography

The municipality is located on the northern coast of western Finnmark, comprising parts of the mainland (located on the Porsanger Peninsula) and many islands of various sizes. The main islands include Måsøya, Hjelmsøya, Havøya, Ingøya, and Rolvsøya. Most people live in the village of Havøysund, but there are also small hamlets spread around the islands and in the fjord areas, notably Snefjord, Slåtten, Ingøy, Gunnarnes, and Måsøy. The large lake Havvatnet lies in the southern part of the municipality.

Birdlife
Lying in the northwest part of the county, Måsøy has a selection of habitats and a varied birdlife. Once again, some of the county's largest seabird colonies can be found in the municipality with the island of Hjelmsøya being one of the more interesting. White-tailed eagles can be seen as well as both Arctic skuas and great skuas.

Climate
Måsøy has a subpolar oceanic climate (Köppen climate classification: Cfc), due to the relatively mild winter, but also due to the precipitation pattern with drier summer and wetter winter, which is opposite of the subarctic climate. Fruholmen was earlier a tundra climate, and is close to tundra with 1991-2020 normals. As the weather station is located at an exposed lighthouse, the inhabited areas of the municipality such as Havøysund will be slightly warmer in summer and slightly colder in winter than Fruholmen.

Notable people 
 Johannes Olai Olsen (1895 in Måsøy – 1974) a Norwegian fisherman and Mayor of Måsøy 1928-1940
 Lorentz Eldjarn (1920 in Måsøy – 2007) a Norwegian biochemist and medical doctor
 Selmer Nilsen (1931 in Bakfjord – 1991) a Norwegian fisherman, spied for the GRU during the Cold War.
 Aagot Vinterbo-Hohr (born 1936 in Måsøy) a Norwegian Sami physician and writer
 Markus Svendsen (born 1941 in Havøysund) a Norwegian skier, competed at the 1968 Winter Olympics
 Hanne Grete Einarsen (born 1966) a Norwegian-Sami artist, lives in Snefjord

References

External links

Municipal fact sheet from Statistics Norway 

 
Municipalities of Troms og Finnmark
Populated places of Arctic Norway
1838 establishments in Norway